Gabriel Hottegindre (born 26 November 1979) is a Uruguayan alpine skier.  He represented his country at the 1998 Winter Olympics in Nagano, Japan, where he placed 24th in the men's slalom race.

References 
 

1979 births
Living people
Uruguayan male alpine skiers
Olympic alpine skiers of Uruguay
Alpine skiers at the 1998 Winter Olympics